Tulosesus subimpatiens is a species of mushroom producing fungus in the family Psathyrellaceae.

Taxonomy 
It was first described as Coprinus subimpatiens by mycologists the mycologists Morten Lange and Alexander H. Smith in 1952. 

In 2001 a phylogenetic study resulted in a major reorganization and reshuffling of that genus and this species was transferred to Coprinellus.

The species was known as Coprinellus subimpatiens until 2020 when the German mycologists Dieter Wächter & Andreas Melzer reclassified many species in the Psathyrellaceae family based on phylogenetic analysis.

References

subimpatiens
Fungi described in 1952
Tulosesus